The Office for Government Policy Coordination, OPC in short, is a government agency of South Korea consisting Prime Minister's Office with Prime Minister's Secretariat (PMS). It is led by a ministerial-level Minister for Government Policy Coordination unlike Chief of Staff to the Prime Minister who leads PMS and serves at a vice-ministerial level. The OPC Minister chairs the Vice Ministers' Council which supports State Council which is composed of ministers and led by the President and often Prime Minister. Moreover, the OPC Minister is supported by two vice-ministerial Vice Ministers.

It was the first government agency to move its headquarters to Sejong in 2012.

It has Tax Tribunal and National Counter-Terrorism Center as its child agencies. It also oversees many government-funded research institutes, which mostly reside in Sejong, including Korea Development Institute and OECD Korea Policy Center.

History 
Its history can be traced back to 1973 when the Administrative Coordination Office was established. In 1998 the Office changed its name to the Office for Government Policy Coordination which is used by today. In 2008 the Office was merged with Prime Minister's Secretariat into the Prime Minister's Office. In 2013 it was unmerged and restructured to form the Prime Minister's Office together with PMS.

Several people were appointed as Minister of Economy and Finance after serving as Minister for Government Policy Coordination including Kim Jin-pyo, Kim Dong-yeon, Hong Nam-ki, Han Duck-soo and Choo Kyung-ho.

References

External links 

 Official website in English

Government agencies of South Korea